The 2021 America East Conference women's soccer tournament was the postseason women's soccer tournament for the America East Conference held from October 31 through November 7, 2021. The five-match tournament took place at campus sites, with the higher seed hosting. The six-team single-elimination tournament consisted of three rounds based on seeding from regular season conference play. The defending champions were the Stony Brook Seawolves, who were unable to defend their title after not qualifying for the tournament. Vermont won their first tournament in program history after a 1–0 victory in the final.  It was the first victory for eleventh year head coach Kristi Huizenga. As tournament champions, Vermont earned the America East's automatic berth into the 2021 NCAA Division I Women's Soccer Tournament.

Seeding 
The top six teams in the regular season earned a spot in the tournament.  UMass Lowell and NJIT finished tied for second in the regular season standings with each team having a record of 5–3–1.  UMass Lowell earned the second seed by virtue of their 2–1 regular season win over NJIT on September 19.  Binghamton and Albany finished tied for fourth place with each team having a regular season record of 4–3–2.  Albany earned the fourth seed by virtue of their 1–0 regular season win over Binghamton on October 28.  Stony Brook and New Hampshire tied for the sixth and final place in the tournament with each team having a regular season record of 4–4–1.  New Hampshire earned the final spot in the tournament by virtue of their 3–0 regular season win over Stony Brook on October 3.

Bracket

Schedule

Quarterfinals

Semifinals

Final

Statistics

Goalscorers

All-Tournament team 

Source:

MVP in bold

References 

 
America East Conference Women's Soccer Tournament